Ceratocystis tyalla is a plant pathogen, affecting Australian Eucalyptus species. It was first isolated from tree wounds and nitidulid beetles associated with these wounds.

References

Further reading

External links 

MycoBank

Microascales